The Korea University Medical Center (KUMC) is a collection of several hospitals, as well as the College of Medicine and College of Nursing associated with Korea University in Seoul, South Korea. The hospital's branches that are under the KUMC are Anam Hospital, Guro Hospital, and Ansan Hospital. KUMC’s mission is “ Ensuring the health and happiness of mankind with cutting-edge medical technologies and respect for life”. Their vision is “Enabling future medicine”. They were “The first medical educational institution funded independently with the nation’s resources”

History
The KUMC was originally Kyoung-sung Women's Medical College which opened on May 5, 1938, and was renamed multiple times until March 1, 1976, when it was renamed as the hospital affiliated with Korea University. On October 1. 1983, it was established as Korea University Medical Center. 

Guro Hospital opened on September 15, 1983.  July 20, 2010, it was awarded the Grand Prize of the Korea Health Industry. 

Ansan Hospital, previously named Panwol, opened on April 15, 1985, and was renamed to its current name, Ansan, on May 1, 1986. 

Anam Hospital opened on October 8, 1991. This branch was transformed from the Hyehwa Hospital which was a 400-bed hospital and is now a 1000-bed medical facility. In 2009 the hospital was awarded the president's prize in the National Quality Management Competition.

Research
“a 55-year-old male with liver cancer at the Korea University Medical Center Anam Hospital was the first patient in Korea to receive treatment on the Halcyon™ system” 

There was a study done “to evaluate the postoperative and survival outcomes of robotic-assisted colorectal cancer surgery in elderly patients”(Cuellar-Gomez et al., 2022), and the data used was with that “of all patients ≥75 years who underwent a robotic-assisted curative resection in Korea University Anam Hospital, Seoul, South Korea, between January 2007 and January 2021” 

Other historical Achievements 
In 1976  Discovery of the Hantavirus and developed the vaccine in 1988
In 1999 Development and transplantation of artificial hearts customized for Korea 
In 2009 Successful domestic production of the swine flu vaccine 
In 2016 First medical college in Korea to satisfy the WFME evaluation standard

Education
Korea University College of Medicine started off as Kyungsung Women's Medical College in 1938 and was renamed to its now name in 1971. The university consists of around 370 professors, and 800 students. The three departments of basic science, clinical science, and graduate school are within the college.
 	The areas of specialization in the department of basic science are, Parasitology, Neuroscience, Microbiology, Forensic Medicine, Pathology, Physiology, Biochemistry, and Molecular Biology, Pharmacology, Preventive Medicine, Biomedical Engineering, History of Medicine & Medical Humanities, Biostatistics, Anatomy, and Medical Education
The areas of specialization in the department of Clinical Science are Family Medicine, Anesthesiology, Urology, Plastic Surgery, Neurology, Ophthalmology, Surgery, Otorhinolaryngology, Rehabilitation Medicine, Orthopedics, Laboratory Medicine, Integrative Medicine, Nuclear Medicine, Internal Medicine, Radiation Oncology, Obstetrics and Gynecology, Pediatrics, Neurosurgery, Radiology, Emergency Medicine, clinical pharmacology, Psychiatry, Occupational and Environmental Medicine, Dentistry, Dermatology,  and Thoracic Surgery. 

Korea University College of Health Science is made up of the Schools of Biomedical Engineering, Biosystem and Biomedical Science, Health and Environmental Science, and  Health Policy and Management 
Graduate School of Clinical Dentistry

College of Nursing

References

Korea University
Teaching hospitals in South Korea
Hospital networks
Hospitals in Seoul